The 1879 Glasgow by-election was fought on 16 July 1879.  The byelection was fought due to the death of the incumbent Conservative MP, Alexander Whitelaw.  It was won by the unopposed Liberal candidate Charles Clow Tennant.

References

1879 in Scotland
1870s elections in Scotland
1879 elections in the United Kingdom
By-elections to the Parliament of the United Kingdom in Glasgow constituencies
1870s in Glasgow
Unopposed by-elections to the Parliament of the United Kingdom in Scottish constituencies